La Motte-Picquet–Grenelle is a station of the Paris Métro, at the interconnection of line 6, line 8, and line 10 in the 15th arrondissement. The station combines underground and elevated platforms. It is a major métro interchange on the Rive Gauche, the most important west of Montparnasse.

History

The elevated station first opened on 24 April 1906 under the name La Motte-Piquet, as part of the extension of line 2 South from Passy to Place d'Italie. It was named after the nearby avenue de La Motte-Picquet, after Admiral Toussaint-Guillaume Picquet de La Motte (1720-1791), and boulevard de Grenelle, a former commune until it was annexed by Paris in 1860.

On 14 October 1907, line 2 South was incorporated into line 5, which now plied between Étoile (now Charles de Gaulle–Étoile) and Lancry (now Jacques Bonsergent)

On 13 July 1942, line 8's platforms opened as part of the initial section of the line from Beaugrenelle (now Charles Michels) and Opéra. On the same day, the station was renamed La Motte-Picquet–Grenelle, which it still remains today. These are the current platforms served by lines 8 towards Créteil and 10 towards Gare d'Austerlitz. It was originally intended for line 8 to run from Opéra with two branches, one to Porte d'Auteuil  and the other to Balard, with the line branching from La Motte-Picquet–Grenelle. Hence, the island platform was designed to accommodate trains coming from both branches then onwards to Opéra. The platform used today for line 10's service to Boulogne would have been the southbound platform for service to the two branches, although this had not been built yet.

From 17 May to 6 December 1931, the section between Place d'Italie and Étoile of line 5 was temporarily transferred to line 6 to provide service to the colonial exhibition held at Bois de Vincennes that year. It was eventually returned to line 5.

The section of line 8 from La Motte-Picquet–Grenelle to Porte d'Auteuil was transferred to line 10 on 27 July 1937 when line 8 was extended south to Balard. However, service between Porte d'Auteuil and Jussieu was not provided with service initially limited to La Motte-Picquet–Grenelle until the underground connection for line 10 was opened linking La Motte-Picquet–Grenelle and Duroc two days later. This was part of the reconfiguration of lines 8, 10, and the old line 14. The platform for line 8's services to Balard was built beneath the existing platforms due to the narrow confines of the streets above. Line 8's platforms on the island platform were extended to 105 m to cater for 7-car trains in the future, although the plan did not materialise in the end.

On 6 October 1942, the section of line 5 between Place d'Italie and Étoile, including La Motte-Picquet–Grenelle, was transferred back to line 6 in anticipation of the opening of the extension of line 5 to Eglise de Pantin on 12 October that same year. This was to prevent line 5 from becoming too long.

In 1969, the platform used for line 8 services to Balard was renovated in the "Mouton-Duvernet" style with its characteristic orange coloured tiles instead of the typical bevelled white tiles used extensively elsewhere in the network.

As part of the "Renouveau du métro" programme by the RATP, the access corridors to line 6 were renovated in 2007 along with its platforms in 2008. The platform used for line 8 services to Balard was also renovated in 2014, removing the "Mouton-Duvernet" style decoration on the side wall of the platform (the side walls of the tracks still retains it), bringing back the use of the white tiles. From 1 July to 31 August 2020, the station was closed to replace their asphalt flooring with anthracite gray tiling along the access corridors to line 6 as well as the platforms of lines 8 and 10. In 2022, some of the staircases in the station were installed with street art by artist Chris Puddy.

In 2019, the station was used by 7,958,383 passengers, making it the 30th busiest of the Métro network out of 302 stations.

In 2020, the station was used by 3,428,458 passengers amidst the COVID-19 pandemic, making it the 44th busiest of the Métro network out of 305 stations.

In 2021, the station was used by 5,117,708 passengers, making it the 34th busiest of the Métro network out of 305 stations.

Passenger services

Access
The station has 5 accesses:

Access 1: rue de Commerce
Access 2: avenue de La Motte-Picquet (with an escalator)
Access 3: boulevard de Grenelle
Access 4: rue de Pondichéry (access to lines 8 and 10 only)
Access 5: avenue de Suffren (access to lines 8 and 10 only)

Station layout

Platforms
Line 6's station is elevated and has a standard configuration with 2 tracks surrounded by 2 side platforms. On the other hand, the underground platforms for lines 8 and 10 have a unique configuration. 

On the upper level are the tracks of lines 8 and 10 both heading east on either side of an island platform, measuring 105 m (line 8) and 75 m (line 10) respectively, as well as the track of line 10 in the direction of Boulogne located in a half-station separated by a wall on the east of the island platform, comprising a single track with a side platform measuring 105 m in length, a feature unique on the line. The island platform is contained in an elliptical vault, except for the northeast end of the platform for line 8 when it was extended in 1937. It has a horizontal ceiling painted white.

On the lower level is a half station for line 8 services to Balard, also with a single platform and track and is 105 m long. It has almost entirely vertical side walls and a low, flat ceiling, inclined towards the platform, barring the northeastern end which has a slightly higher elliptical vault. The side walls are also clad with flat white tiles arranged vertically instead of in staggered rows like most other stations on the métro, a feature only found at Père Lachaise on line 2 and at Gare du Nord on line 4 (until 2017).

Other connections
The station is also served by lines 80 and 82 of the RATP bus network.

Gallery

References
Roland, Gérard (2003). Stations de métro. D’Abbesses à Wagram. Éditions Bonneton.

Paris Métro stations in the 15th arrondissement of Paris
Railway stations in France opened in 1906